Brian Gregory ( – January 2002) was a professional rugby league footballer who played in the 1960s and 1970s.

Background
Brian Gregory died aged 53 in Tenerife, Spain.

Playing career

International honours
Brian Gregory won caps for Wales while at Wigan in the 1975 Rugby League World Cup against England, New Zealand, and France.

County honours
Brian Gregory won 2-caps for Lancashire while at Warrington.

Club career
Gregory started his career with Salford before moving to Warrington where he won 2-caps for Lancashire. In November 1973, he joined Oldham for a transfer fee of £7,500, where he scored five tries in 29 appearances for the club. A year later, Gregory was a signed by Wigan for a fee of £9,500, (based on increases in average earnings, this would be approximately £134,500 in 2015).

References

External links
Profile at wigan.rlfans.com
Profile at wolvesplayers.thisiswarrington.co.uk

1949 births
2002 deaths
Lancashire rugby league team players
Oldham R.L.F.C. players
Place of birth missing
Rugby league locks
Rugby league second-rows
Salford Red Devils players
Wakefield Trinity players
Warrington Wolves players
Wales national rugby league team players
Welsh rugby league players
Wigan Warriors players